The Swedish Coast Guard is a Swedish civilian government agency tasked with:
 maritime surveillance and other control and inspection tasks as well as environmental cleanup after oil spills at sea.
 co-ordinate the civilian needs for maritime surveillance and maritime information.
 follow international development within the field and take part in international efforts to establish border controls, law enforcement at sea, environmental protection at sea and other maritime surveillance tasks.

The Swedish Coast Guard carries out some of its surveillance by air (from its base at Skavsta Airport south-west of Stockholm), and in the winter-time by hovercraft on the ice-covered waters of the Bothnian Bay from its Luleå station. The Coast Guard also has regular maritime duties in Vänern, Europe's third largest lake, operating out of Vänersborg.

Organization

The Coast Guard has 26 coastal stations, including an aviation coastal station.  The stations fall under four regional areas; North (KRN), East (KRO), West (KRV) and South (KRS); with the regional headquarters located in Härnösand, Stockholm, Gothenburg, and Karlskrona respectively. Four management centers control the daily operational activities and there is also at least one duty officer around the clock. The Coast Guard's central headquarters is located in the historic 17th century naval city of Karlskrona, which is a UNESCO World Heritage Site.

The total number of Coast Guard employees across the country amounts to around 800.

Neither Coast Guard ships or officers carry military weapons. Instead each officer is equipped with Glock 17, ASP baton, OC spray and handcuffs.

Coast Guard vessels

Surveillance Ships

The Coast Guard currently has 22 surveillance craft which are used mainly for patrolling with some also given oil spill response capacity.

Environmental Protection Vessels
The Coast Guard currently has 12 environmental protection vessels primarily used for oil spill response, and secondly for patrolling.

Combination
The Coast Guard currently has nine ships which combine the characteristics of both environmental protection vessels and surveillance craft. KBV 001, KBV 002, KBV 003, KBV 031, KBV 032, KBV 033, KBV 034, KBV 201 and KBV 202.

Hovercraft
The Coast Guard operates five hovercraft mainly in northern Sweden where they can easily travel over both ice, water and land. KBV 593 based in Luleå, KBV 592 based in Umeå, KBV 591 based in Örnsköldsvik, KBV 594 KBV based in Vaxholm, and 595.

Barges
The Coast Guard maintains one large barge, KBV 866 in Härnösand, used for the storage of absorbed oil from spills.

Boats
The Coast Guard currently has over 100 boats. Some boats are used as a complement to larger ships, while others operate as separate entities. The boats are divided into four groups: High Speed/Go Fast, rib-boats, dinghies and work boats.

Personal Equipment
Glock 17 Gen 3 9×19mm pistol

Coast Guard Aviation

The Coast Guard has replaced its CASA C-212s with three new Bombardier Dash 8 Q-300 aircraft numbered KBV 501, 502 and 503. The new Dash 8 Maritime Surveillance Aircraft were modified by Field Aviation in Toronto, Canada. The Coast Guard Aviation Home base is Skavsta Airport in Nyköping. Surveillance and reconnaissance flights are conducted along the Swedish coast and Vänern year-round, day and night. Additional regular international assignments are also flown as needed.

The division operate their flights as VFR and use VFR flight rules throughout the majority of their flights. Some flights, either operating/ferrying internationally or for longer distances, fly using IFR rules.

Incidents 
 On October 26, 2006, a Swedish Coast Guard CASA 212-200 (registration: SE-IVF/serial nr: KBV 585) crashed in the Falsterbo Canal during a surveillance mission, killing all four on board. Full article: 2006 Falsterbo Swedish Coast Guard crash

See also 
 Swedish Armed Forces
 Swedish Maritime Administration
 Swedish National Board of Fisheries

References

External links 
 Swedish Coast Guard – official website  (some English)

1988 establishments in Sweden
Coast guards
Defence agencies of Sweden
Coast Guard
Border guards
Coast Guard
Borders of Sweden
Emergency services in Sweden